The 2016–17 Top League Challenge Series was the 2016–17 edition of the Top League Challenge Series, a second-tier rugby union competition in Japan, in which teams from regionalised leagues competed for promotion to the Top League for the 2017–18 season. The competition was contested from 13 December 2016 to 24 January 2017.

NTT DoCoMo Red Hurricanes won promotion to the 2017–18 Top League, while Hino Red Dolphins, Kyuden Voltex and Mitsubishi Sagamihara DynaBoars progressed to the promotion play-offs. Chubu Electric Power, Chugoku Electric Power, Kamaishi Seawaves and Mazda Blue Zoomers all earned a place in the new 2017 Top Challenge League.

Competition rules and information

The top three teams from the regional Top East League, Top West League and Top Kyūshū League qualified to the Top League Challenge Series. The regional league winners participated in Challenge 1, the runners-up participated in Challenge 2 and the third-placed teams participated in Challenge 3. The winner of Challenge 2 also progressed to a four-team Challenge 1.

The top team in Challenge 1 won automatic promotion to the 2017–18 Top League, while the other three teams qualified to the promotion play-offs.

Qualification

The teams qualified to the Challenge 1, Challenge 2 and Challenge 3 series through the 2016 regional leagues.

Top West League

The final standings for the 2016 Top West League were:

 Chubu Electric Power, NTT DoCoMo Red Hurricanes and Osaka Police qualified to the Second Phase.

 NTT DoCoMo Red Hurricanes qualified for Challenge 1.
 Chubu Electric Power qualified for Challenge 2.
 Osaka Police qualified for Challenge 3.

Top East League

The final standings for the 2016 Top East League were:

 Mitsubishi Sagamihara DynaBoars qualified for Challenge 1.
 Hino Red Dolphins qualified for Challenge 2.
 Kamaishi Seawaves qualified for Challenge 3.

Top Kyūshū League

The final standings for the 2016 Top Kyūshū League were:

 Chugoku Electric Power, Kyuden Voltex and Mazda Blue Zoomers qualified to the Second Phase.

 Kyuden Voltex qualified for Challenge 1.
 Chugoku Electric Power qualified for Challenge 2.
 Mazda Blue Zoomers qualified for Challenge 3.

Challenge 1

Standings

The final standings for the 2016–17 Top League Challenge 1 were:

 NTT DoCoMo Red Hurricanes won promotion to the 2017–18 Top League.
 Hino Red Dolphins, Kyuden Voltex and Mitsubishi Sagamihara DynaBoars progressed to the promotion play-offs.

Matches

The following matches were played in the 2016–17 Top League Challenge 1:

Challenge 2

Standings

The final standings for the 2016–17 Top League Challenge 2 were:

 Hino Red Dolphins progressed to Challenge 1.
 Chubu Electric Power and Chugoku Electric Power joined the 2017 Top Challenge League.

Matches

The following matches were played in the 2016–17 Top League Challenge 2:

Challenge 3

Standings

The final standings for the 2016–17 Top League Challenge 3 were:

 Kamaishi Seawaves and Mazda Blue Zoomers joined the 2017 Top Challenge League.

Matches

The following matches were played in the 2016–17 Top League Challenge 3:

See also

 2016–17 Top League
 Top League Challenge Series

References

2016-17 Challenge
2016–17 in Japanese rugby union
2016–17 rugby union tournaments for clubs